The 2017 Yas Marina FIA Formula 2 round was a pair of motor races held on 25 and 26 November 2017 at the Yas Marina Circuit in Abu Dhabi, United Arab Emirates as part of the FIA Formula 2 Championship. It was the final showdown of the 2017 FIA Formula 2 Championship and was run in support of the 2017 Abu Dhabi Grand Prix.

This was the final race for the Dallara GP2/11 chassis that was introduced at the 2011 Yas Marina Circuit GP2 Asia Series round and also the final race for the Mecachrome V8 engine package that had been part of the GP2 Series and FIA Formula 2 since its formation in 2005. The Dallara F2 2018 chassis with a Mecachrome V6 turbocharged engine was introduced for the 2018 FIA Formula 2 Championship onwards.

Classifications

Qualifying

Feature Race

Sprint Race

Final championship standings

Drivers' Championship standings

Teams' Championship standings

 Note: Only the top five positions are included for both sets of standings.

See also 
 2017 Abu Dhabi Grand Prix
 2017 Yas Marina GP3 Series round

References

External links 
 

Yas Marina
Formula 2
Formula 2